Endre Kiss (31 August 1947 – 5 September 2006) was a Hungarian judoka. He competed at the 1976 Summer Olympics and the 1980 Summer Olympics.

References

External links
 

1947 births
2006 deaths
Hungarian male judoka
Olympic judoka of Hungary
Judoka at the 1976 Summer Olympics
Judoka at the 1980 Summer Olympics
People from Kecskemét
Sportspeople from Bács-Kiskun County
20th-century Hungarian people
21st-century Hungarian people